Samantha Ramautar (born 11 February 1987) is an American former cricketer. She made her international debut at the 2011 Women's Cricket World Cup Qualifier. In March 2019, she was named in the United States team for the 2019 ICC Women's Qualifier Americas tournament against Canada. She made her WT20I debut for the United States against Canada in the Americas Qualifier on 17 May 2019.

In August 2019, she was named in the American squad for the 2019 ICC Women's World Twenty20 Qualifier tournament in Scotland. She played in the United States' opening match of the tournament, on 31 August 2019, against Scotland.

In February 2021, she was named in the Women's National Training Group by the USA Cricket Women's National Selectors ahead of the 2021 Women's Cricket World Cup Qualifier and the 2021 ICC Women's T20 World Cup Americas Qualifier tournaments. In September 2021, USA Cricket confirmed that Ramautar had retired from playing international cricket.

References

External links 
 

1987 births
Living people
American women cricketers
United States women Twenty20 International cricketers
People from Linden, Guyana
Guyanese emigrants to the United States
American people of Indo-Guyanese descent
American sportspeople of Guyanese descent
21st-century American women